John Rogers was the last elected Principal Chief of the Cherokee Nation West, elected 11 October 1839 by the faction of Old Settlers who rejected the unity constitution of September 1839.  The rejectionist faction gained no further adherents and the effort died the next year.  Rogers was the nephew of previous Cherokee Nation West principal chiefs Tahlonteeskee and John Jolly.

External links 

Year of birth missing
Year of death missing
Principal Chiefs of the Cherokee Nation (1794–1907)